Hispania Baetica, often abbreviated Baetica, was one of three Roman provinces in Hispania (the Iberian Peninsula). Baetica was bordered to the west by Lusitania, and to the northeast by Hispania Tarraconensis.  Baetica remained one of the basic divisions of Hispania under the Visigoths down to 711. Baetica was part of Al-Andalus under the Arabs in the 8th century and approximately corresponds to modern Andalusia.

Name 

History 
Before Romanization, the mountainous area that was to become Baetica was occupied by several settled Iberian tribal groups. Celtic influence was not as strong as it was in the Celtiberian north. According to the geographer Claudius Ptolemy, the indigenes were the powerful Turdetani, in the valley of the Guadalquivir in the west, bordering on Lusitania, and the partly Hellenized Turduli with their city Baelo, in the hinterland behind the coastal Phoenician trading colonies, whose Punic inhabitants Ptolemy termed the "Bastuli". Phoenician Gadira (Cadiz) was on an island against the coast of Hispania Baetica. Other important Iberians were the Bastetani, who occupied the Almería and mountainous Granada regions.  Towards the southeast, Punic influence spread from the Carthaginian cities on the coast: New Carthage (Roman Cartago Nova, modern Cartagena), Abdera and Malaca (Málaga).

Some of the Iberian cities retained their pre-Indo-European names in Baetica throughout the Roman era. Granada was called Eliberri, Illiberis and Illiber by the Romans; in Basque, "iri-berri" or "ili-berri", still signifies "new town".

The south of the Iberian peninsula was agriculturally rich, providing for export of wine, olive oil and the fermented fish sauce called garum that were staples of the Mediterranean diet, and its products formed part of the western Mediterranean trade economy even before it submitted to Rome in 206 BC. After the defeat of Carthage in the Second Punic War, which found its casus belli on the coast of Baetica at Saguntum, Hispania was significantly Romanized in the course of the 2nd century BC, following the uprising initiated by the Turdetani in 197. The central and north-eastern Celtiberians soon followed suit. It took Cato the Elder, who became consul in 195 BC and was given the command of the whole peninsula to put down the rebellion in the northeast and the lower Ebro valley. He then marched southwards and put down a revolt by the Turdetani. Cato returned to Rome in 194, leaving two praetors in charge of the two Iberian provinces. In the late Roman Republic, Hispania remained divided like Gaul into a "Nearer" and a "Farther" province, as experienced marching overland from Gaul: Hispania Citerior (the Ebro region), and Ulterior (the Guadalquivir region). The battles in Hispania during the 1st century BC were largely confined to the north.

In the reorganization of the Empire in 14 BC, Baetica was made a senatorial province governed by a proconsul who had formerly been a praetor. Fortune smiled on rich Baetica, which was Baetica Felix, and a dynamic, upwardly-mobile social and economic middling stratum developed there, which absorbed freed slaves and far outnumbered the rich elite. The Senatorial province of Baetica became so secure that no Roman legion was required to be permanently stationed there. Legio VII Gemina was permanently stationed to the north, in Hispania Tarraconensis.

Hispania Baetica was divided into four conventūs, which were territorial divisions like judicial circuits, where the chief men met together at major centers, at fixed times of year, under the eye of the proconsul, to oversee the administration of justice: the conventus Gaditanus (of Gades, or Cádiz), Cordubensis (of Cordoba), Astigitanus (of Astigi, or Écija), and Hispalensis (of Hispalis, or Seville). As the towns became the permanent seats of standing courts during the later Empire, the conventūs were superseded (Justinian's Code, i.40.6) and the term conventus is lastly applied to certain bodies of Roman citizens living in a province, forming a sort of enfranchised corporation, and representing the Roman people in their district as a kind of gentry; and it was from among these that proconsuls generally took their assistants. So in spite of some social upsets, as when Septimius Severus put to death a number of leading Baetians— including women — the elite in Baetica remained a stable class for centuries.

Columella, who wrote a twelve volume treatise on all aspects of Roman farming and knew viticulture, came from Baetica. The vast olive plantations of Baetica shipped olive oil from the coastal ports by sea to supply Roman legions in Germania. Amphoras from Baetica have been found everywhere in the Western Roman empire. It was to keep Roman legions supplied by sea routes that the Empire needed to control the distant coasts of Lusitania and the northern Atlantic coast of Hispania.

Baetica was rich and utterly Romanized, facts that the Emperor Vespasian was rewarding when he granted the Ius latii that extended the rights pertaining to Roman citizenship (latinitas) to the inhabitants of Hispania, an honor that secured the loyalty of the Baetian elite and its middle class. The Roman Emperor Trajan, the first emperor of provincial birth, came from Baetica, though of Italian stock, and his kinsman and successor Hadrian came from a family residing in Baetica, though Hadrian himself was born at Rome (which some say he made up). Baetia was Roman until the brief invasion of the Vandals and Alans passed through in the 5th century, followed by the more permanent kingdom of the Visigoths. The province formed part of the Exarchate of Africa and was joined to Mauretania Tingitana after Belisarius' reconquest of Africa. The Catholic bishops of Baetica, solidly backed by their local population, were able to convert the Arian Visigoth king Reccared and his nobles. In the 8th century, Baetica became part of the Umayyad Caliphate of Damascus after the Arabs conquered it. The region became known as "al-Andalus".

The early 20th-century composer Manuel de Falla wrote a Fantasía Bética for piano, using Andalusian melodies.

Proconsuls 
The Province was governed by a proconsul who had formerly been a praetor. 
{| class="wikitable"
|+
!Proconsuls
!Term Start
!Term End
|-
|Gaius Vibius Serenus
|20 AD
|22 AD
|-
|Gaius Caetronius Miccio
| 37 AD
| 38 AD
|-
|Umbonĭus Silĭo
|43 AD
|44 AD
|-
|Marcus Ulpius Traianus
|?
|Before 67 AD
|-
|Lucius Lucullus
|70s AD
|70s AD
|-
|[? Marcus] Sempronius Fuscus<ref>Unless otherwise noted, governors from 78/79 to 136/137 are taken from Werner Eck, "Jahres- und Provinzialfasten der senatorischen Statthalter von 69/70 bis 138/139", Chiron, 12 (1982), pp. 281–362; 13 (1983), pp. 147–237.</ref>
|78 AD
|79 AD
|-
|Gaius Cornelius Gallicanus
|79 AD
|80 AD
|-
|Lucius Antistius Rusticus
|83 AD
|84 AD
|-
|Baebius Massa
|91 AD
|92 AD
|-
|Galeo Tettienus Severus Marcus Eppuleius Proculus Tiberius Caepio Hispo
|95 AD
|96 AD
|-
|? Gallus
|96 AD
|97 AD
|-
|Gaius Caecilius Classicus
|97 AD
|98 AD
|-
|Quintus Baebius Macer
|100 AD
|101 AD
|-
|Instanius Rufus
|101 AD
|102 AD
|-
|? Lustricius Bruttianus
|Before 107 AD
|Before 107 AD
|-
|[? Titus] Calestrius Tiro
|107 AD
|108 AD
|-
|Egnatius Taurinus
|between 138 AD and 143 AD
|between 138 AD and 143 AD
|-
|? Gaius Julius Proculus
|122 AD
|123 AD
|-
|Publius Tullius Varro
|123 AD
|124 AD
|-
|Lucius Flavius Arrianus
|before 129 AD
|before 129 AD
|-
|Gaius Javolenus Calvinus
|between 138 AD and 143 AD
|between 138 AD and 143 AD
|-
|Aelius Marcianus
|between 138 AD and 161 AD
|between 138 AD and 161 AD
|-
|Publius Statius Paullus Postumus Junior
|middle of the 2nd century
|middle of the 2nd century
|-
|Publius Cornelius Anullinus
|170 AD
|171 AD
|-
|Gaius Aufidius Victorinus
|171 AD
|171 AD
|-
|Gaius Memmius Fidus Julius Albius
|183 AD
|183 AD
|-
|Caecilius Aemilianus
|215 AD
|215 AD
|-
|Aulus Caecina Tacitus
|first half 3rd century
|first half 3rd century
|-
|L. Sempronius O[...] Celsus [Servi]lius Fabianus
|first half 3rd century
|first half 3rd century
|-
|Quintus Pomponius Munat[ianus?] Clodianus
|first half 3rd century
|first half 3rd century
|}

See also
Pre-Roman peoples of the Iberian Peninsula
Romanization of Hispania
Spania

References
Citations

Bibliography
Carmen Castillo García, Prosopographia Baetica (Collective biographies of Baetica), 1968
Carmen Castillo García, Städte und Personen der Baetica'' (Settlements in Baetica), 1975
A.T. Fear, Rome and Baetica: Urbanization in Southern Spain, C. 50 BC – AD 150 in the series "Oxford Classical Monographs".
Evan Haley,  Baetica Felix: People and Prosperity in Southern Spain from Caesar to Septimius Severus, (excerpt from the Introduction).
 El Housin Helal Ouriachen, 2009, La ciudad bética durante la Antigüedad Tardía. Persistencias y mutaciones locales en relación con la realidad urbana del Mediterraneo y del Atlántico, Tesis doctoral, Universidad de Granada, Granada.

External links
"Baetica, the great olive oil producer"
Detailed map of the Pre-Roman Peoples of Iberia (around 200 BC)

 

 
States and territories established in the 1st century BC
History of Córdoba, Spain
14 BC establishments